Doassansia is a genus of fungi belonging to the family Doassansiaceae.

The species of this genus are found in Europe and Northern America.

Ecology
They are parasitic on plants, attaching to leaves and stems of monocotyledons.
Doassansia sagittariae and Doassansiopsis deformans can be found on plants of Sagittaria lancifolia, Doassansia alismatis can be found on various species of Alisma and both Doassansiopsis occulta and Doassansiopsis hydrophila can be found on various species of Potamogeton plants.

Species
As accepted by GBIF;

Doassansia alismatis 
Doassansia alpina 
Doassansia borealis 
Doassansia disticha 
Doassansia domingensis 
Doassansia eichhorniae 
Doassansia epilobii 
Doassansia epilobii 
Doassansia gossypii 
Doassansia hemigraphidis 
Doassansia lilaeae 
Doassansia limosellae 
Doassansia nearctica 
Doassansia niesslii 
Doassansia opaca 
Doassansia peplidis 
Doassansia reukaufii 
Doassansia rhinanthi 
Doassansia sagittariae 
Doassansia sintenisii 
Doassansia sparganii 
Doassansia utriculariae 
Doassansia zizaniae

References

Ustilaginomycotina
Basidiomycota genera